Almirante Condell was a destroyer which served with the Chilean Navy through World War I and World War II. She was the second ship in the Chilean Navy to bear this name.

The Chilean Navy ordered six ships from J. Samuel White in 1911. These destroyers were larger and more powerful than contemporary British destroyers. Almirante Condell was built by the United Kingdom as part of a six-ship  of destroyers, of which only two ships were delivered before the outbreak of war. Those two ships served in the Chilean Navy until 1945.

The ship was named after Admiral Carlos Condell, Chilean sailor, hero of the War of the Pacific.

 

Almirante Lynch-class destroyers (1912)
Ships built on the Isle of Wight
1912 ships